The Concilio Interfraternitario Puertorriqueño de la Florida, Inc. (CIPFI)  is an umbrella council for the Florida chapters of five oldest  Puerto Rican fraternities established in 2002.

Members

History
On September 1, 2001, at a meeting of the Orlando chapter of the Phi Eta Mu fraternity, its chapter President, Dr. Carlos Albizu, mentioned the lack of presence of members of the other four Puerto Rican fraternities at their annual picnic. Dr. Albizu asked Eduardo Emmanuelli to try and establish links with this fraternities in the Miami area. Antonio Amadeo, President of the Nu Sigma Beta chapter in Miami, invited Mr. Emmanuelli to the Nu Sigma Beta meeting on December 5, 2001.  The Nu Sigma Beta brothers showed such interest that members of the remaining three fraternities were invited to on organizational meeting. On January 12, 2002 at "El Viajante" restaurant the first meeting of CIPFI took place.  Manuel E. Costas of Phi Sigma Alpha served as the first president.

Looking ahead
The two oldest Puerto Rican Sororities (Mu Alpha Phi and Eta Gamma Delta) are in the process of establishing chapters in Florida. Being part of the "Concilio Interfraternitario" (Inter-fraternity Council) in Puerto Rico, they would most likely join the CIPFI. Eta Gamma Delta recently established an alumni chapter "Zona Omega" in Orlando.

See also
Puerto Rican fraternities and sororities

External links
CIPFI Website

 
Fraternities and sororities in Puerto Rico
2002 establishments in Florida
Student societies in the United States